Antiblemma acclinalis is a moth of the family Noctuidae first described by Jacob Hübner in 1823. It is native to the Antilles. It was introduced in Hawaii to control Clidemia hirta. Although it has become established on Oahu, there is no indication that populations have persisted on Kauai or on Maui, where the moth was first released in 1996.

The larvae feed on the leaves of young Clidemia hirta and Clidemia debilis, primarily in cool, moist locations with moderate to heavy shade. The life cycle takes about 36 days to complete.

References

Catocalinae
Moths of the Caribbean
Lepidoptera used as pest control agents